Ice bucket may refer to:
Ice Bucket Challenge, an activity involving dumping a bucket of ice water on one's head
a type of wine cooler